Jack Lloyd Damaska (born August 21, 1937) is a retired American professional baseball player. He appeared as a pinch hitter, second baseman and left fielder in five Major League games for the  St. Louis Cardinals. He was born in Beaver Falls, Pennsylvania.

Signed by the Cardinals in 1957, Damaska played in 1,902 games during a 17-year-long minor league playing career but his five appearances for the Cardinals all occurred in July of 1963.  He took the field only twice, once at second base and once in the outfield; in four innings on defense, he recorded no chances. He had a total of five at bats, with four strikeouts and one hit, a pinch single off Denny Lemaster of the Milwaukee Braves on July 11 in the first game of a doubleheader. His hit, however, sparked a five-run seventh-inning rally to enable the Cardinals to defeat the Braves, 6–3. He notched his only MLB run scored and run batted in during that rally.

As late as 1973, Damaska was playing for the Québec Carnavals of the Double-A Eastern League.  He spent one year as a minor league manager in 1974 for the Kinston Expos of the Class-A Carolina League, a Montreal affiliate that folded at the end of its only season of play.

When a member of the International League All-Stars against the Milwaukee Braves in 1965, Damaska went three-for-four at the plate, drove in two runs and scored another to lead the All-Stars to a 6–2 upset win over the MLB Braves.

References

External links

Retrosheet
SABR BioProject
Beaver County Sports Hall of Fame website

1937 births
Living people
Atlanta Crackers players
Baseball players from Pennsylvania
Billings Mustangs players
Columbus Jets players
Daytona Beach Islanders players
Jacksonville Suns players
Leones del Caracas players
American expatriate baseball players in Venezuela
Major League Baseball left fielders
Major League Baseball second basemen
Memphis Chickasaws players
Minor league baseball managers
Peninsula Whips players
People from Beaver Falls, Pennsylvania
Québec Carnavals players
Richmond Braves players
St. Louis Cardinals players
Savannah Braves players
Sportspeople from Pennsylvania
Stockton Ports players
Tulsa Oilers (baseball) players
York White Roses players